Salim Abdallah Khalfan (born October 4, 1961) is a former Member of Parliament in the National Assembly of Tanzania.

References

Living people
Members of the National Assembly (Tanzania)
1961 births
Place of birth missing (living people)